Cornas is a commune in the département of Ardèche in the Auvergne-Rhône-Alpes region in southern France. The name is Celtic for "burnt land."

Population

Economy
The region is famous for wine, which is designated Cornas AOC.

See also
Communes of the Ardèche department

References

External links
Gazetteer Entry

Communes of Ardèche
Ardèche communes articles needing translation from French Wikipedia